The Old Corner Bookstore is a historic commercial building located at 283 Washington Street at the corner of School Street in the historic core of Boston, Massachusetts. It was built in 1718 as a residence and apothecary shop, and first became a bookstore in 1828. The building is a designated site on Boston's Freedom Trail, Literary Trail, and Women's Heritage Trail.

The Old Corner Bookstore was listed on the National Register of Historic Places in 1973.

This building is currently under consideration for Boston Landmark status by the Boston Landmarks Commission.

History
The site, situated on what was then part of Cornhill, was formerly the home of Anne Hutchinson, who was expelled from Massachusetts in 1638 for heresy. Thomas Crease purchased the home in 1708, though it burned down in the Great Boston Fire on October 2, 1711.  Crease constructed a new building on the site in 1718 as a residence and apothecary shop. For generations, various pharmacists used the site for the same purpose: the first floor was for commercial use and the upper floors were residential. In 1817, Dr. Samuel Clarke, father of future minister James Freeman Clarke, bought the building.

The building's first use as a bookstore dates to 1828, when Timothy Harrington Carter leased the space, whose address had now changed to 135 Washington Street, from a man named George Brimmer. Carter spent $7,000 renovating the building's commercial space, including the addition of projecting, small-paned windows on the ground floor.

From 1832 to 1865, it was home to Ticknor and Fields, a publishing company founded by William Ticknor, later renamed when he partnered with James T. Fields. For part of the 19th century, the firm was one of the most important publishing companies in the United States, and the Old Corner Bookstore became a meeting-place for such authors as Henry Wadsworth Longfellow, Ralph Waldo Emerson, Nathaniel Hawthorne, Charles Dickens, and Oliver Wendell Holmes Sr. Ticknor and Fields rented out the whole building, using only the corner for a retail space. Other sections of the building, particularly upstairs rooms and storefronts facing School Street, were in turn sublet to other businesses. After the death of Ticknor, Fields wanted to focus on publishing rather than the retail store. On November 12, 1864, he sold the Old Corner Bookstore to E. P. Dutton; Ticknor and Fields moved to Tremont Street. A succession of other publishing houses and booksellers followed Ticknor and Fields in the building.

In keeping with its literary past, in the 1890s the shop carried magazines such as: Arena, Argosy, Army and Navy Journal, Art, Art Amateur, The Atlantic, Black Cat, Bookman, Bradley His Book, Catholic World, The Century Magazine, The Chap-Book, The Church, The Churchman, Current Literature, Donahoe's Magazine, Every Month, Forum, Gunton's Magazine, Harpers Bazaar, Harper's Round Table, Harper's Weekly, Home and Country, Judge, Ladies' Home Journal, Frank Leslie's Popular Monthly, Leslie's Weekly, Life, Lippincott's Monthly Magazine, Munsey's Magazine, The Nation, North American Review, Outing, Pocket Magazine, Poet Lore, Public Opinion, Outlook, Puck, Puritan, Red Letter, Review of Reviews, Scientific American, Scribner's Magazine, Shoppell's, St. Nicholas Magazine, Town Talk, Truth, Vogue, What to Eat, Yale Review, and Youth's Companion.

Preservation
The building was threatened with demolition and replacement by a parking garage in 1960 and was "rescued" through a purchase by Historic Boston, Inc. for the sum of $100,000. Historic Boston is a not-for-profit preservation and real estate organization that rehabilitates historic and culturally significant properties in Boston's neighborhoods so that they are a usable part of the city's present and future. The building is listed on the National Register of Historic Places and is a Boston Landmark under the auspices of the Boston Landmarks Commission.

Tenants

Historical

Tenants of 76 Cornhill
 1718: Thomas Crease
 1789: Herman Brimmer, merchant, John Jackson, broker and Samuel Thayer and Minott Thayer, shopkeepers
 1807: John West
 1817: Dr. Samuel Clarke, apothecary

Tenants of 135 Washington Street
 1828: Carter & Hendee (Richard B. Carter, Charles J. Hendee)
 1829: Benjamin Perkins & Co.
 1830: Gray and Bowen (Frederick T. Gray, Charles Bowen)
 1833: Allen & Ticknor (John Allen, William D. Ticknor)
 1838: Samuel H. Parker
 1840: Parker & Ditson (S.H. Parker, Oliver Ditson)
 1841: William D. Ticknor
 1844: Oliver Ditson
 1847: William D. Ticknor & Co. (Wm. D. Ticknor, John Reed Jr., James T. Fields)
 1853: Ticknor, Reed, and Fields
 1854: Ticknor and Fields
 1868: E.P. Dutton & Co. (Edward Payson Dutton, Charles A. Clapp) and H.O. Houghton & Co.
 1869: A. Williams & Co. (Alexander Williams)

Recent
In recent times, the Old Corner Bookstore's retail space was the original location of the Globe Corner Bookstore (a division of the Old Corner Bookstore, Inc.), which operated there for 16 years from 1982 to 1997 and specialized in travel books and maps. A Boston Globe company store operated in the building from 1998 through 2002, selling Boston Globe products and tourist memorabilia.

A national discount jewelry chain, Ultra Diamonds, occupied the retail space from 2005 until the company's bankruptcy in 2009. Then the space was briefly used as a showroom for crafts created by North Bennet Street School students and faculty. The space now houses a Chipotle Mexican Grill restaurant.

Gallery

See also
National Register of Historic Places listings in northern Boston, Massachusetts

References
Notes

Further reading
 Nathaniel Bradstreet Shurtleff. "Old Corner Bookstore." A topographical and historical description of Boston, Part 1, 2nd ed. Boston: Printed by request of the City Council, 1871
 "Old Corner Bookstore", New England Magazine, Nov. 1903.

External links

 Listing at City of Boston official site
 Official listing on Freedom Trail
 Boston Public Library. Images related to the bookstore, various dates
 Bostonian Society. Photos:
 Old Corner Bookstore, corner of Washington and School Streets, c. 1870-85
 Old Corner Bookstore, corner of School and Washington Streets, c. 1880-85
 Old Corner Bookstore, Washington Street, c. 1884; photo by Boston Camera Club
 Old Corner Bookstore at 283 Washington Street, c. 1890
 Old Corner Bookstore at 283 Washington Street, c. 1900
 Old Corner Bookstore, October 1960
 Old Corner Bookstore at 285 Washington Street, 1964
 Globe Corner Bookstore at 285 Washington Street, c. 1970

Houses completed in 1718
Bookstores in Boston
Commercial buildings on the National Register of Historic Places in Massachusetts
Financial District, Boston
Retail buildings in Massachusetts
National Register of Historic Places in Boston